Boiga saengsomi is a species of snake in the family Colubridae. The species is endemic to Thailand.

Etymology
The specific name, saengsomi, is in honor of Buntot Saengmahasom who is a Thai animal collector.

Geographic range
B. saengsomi is found in southern Thailand.

Habitat
The preferred natural habitat of B. saengsomi is forest.

Reproduction
B. saengsomi is oviparous.

References

Further reading
Nutphand W (1985). "[Banded Green Cat Snake Boiga saengsomi Nutphand (new species)]". Bangkok, Thailand: [Thai Zoological Center of Bangkok]. 6 pp. (in Thai).
Nutphand W, Cox MJ, Smith HM, Chiszar D (1991). "The Original Description, Type Specimen and Status of the Colubrid Snake Boiga saengsomi Nutphand". Bulletin of the Maryland Herpetological Society 27 (3): 157–165.

Reptiles described in 1985
Reptiles of Thailand
saengsomi